Rob Olson, also known as Robbie Olson and Rob Olsen, is a retired U.S. soccer player who is Director of Operations and Coaching for the Virginia-based Southwestern Youth Association Soccer (SYA Soccer).

Youth
Olson graduated from Robinson Secondary School in Fairfax County, Virginia.  He then attended the College of William and Mary from 1977 to 1980, where he played as a forward on the men’s soccer team.  He is ranked 2nd on the school’s list of career goals with 33.

Professional
Olson joined the Georgia Generals of the American Soccer League in 1982.  In 1983, the U.S. Soccer Federation, in coordination with the North American Soccer League (NASL), entered the U.S. national team, known as Team America, into the NASL as a league franchise.  The team drew on U.S. citizens playing in the NASL, Major Indoor Soccer League and American Soccer League.  Two players from the Georgia Generals, Olson and team mate Sonny Askew, signed with Team America.  When Team America finished the 1983 season with a 10-20 record, the worst in the NASL, the USSF withdrew the team from the league.  In 1985, Olson played with the Kalamazoo Kangaroos of the American Indoor Soccer Association.  Finally, in 1988, he reunited with Georgia Generals and Team America teammate Askew when both played for the Washington Stars of the newly re-established ASL.

National team
Olson earned his single cap with the U.S. national team when he came on as a substitute for Boris Bandov in the only U.S. game of 1983.

Post playing career
He joined SYA Soccer in 1986 and became the Assistant Director of Soccer Education since 1997.  He is the current Director of Operations and Coaching.

On May 13, 2006, he was inducted into the Virginia Soccer Hall of Fame.

He coached the Centreville High School Girl's Varsity soccer team, as well as his 3 SYA teams.

References

External links
 SYA Soccer info on Olson
 NASL stats

Living people
American Indoor Soccer Association players
American soccer coaches
American Soccer League (1933–1983) players
American Soccer League (1988–89) players
American soccer players
William & Mary Tribe men's soccer players
Association football forwards
Georgia Generals players
Kalamazoo Kangaroos players
North American Soccer League (1968–1984) players
Team America (NASL) players
United States men's international soccer players
Washington Stars players
1959 births